"Drankin n Smokin" is a song by American rappers Lil Uzi Vert and Future from their collaborative album Pluto x Baby Pluto, released on November 13, 2020. The song was produced by DY Krazy, Hagan and 12Hunna. The song reached number 31 on the Billboard Hot 100 and was certified Gold by RIAA.

Music video
A music video was released on January 7, 2021, directed by DJ Esco and Sam Lecca, and featuring cameos by Lil Duval and Freebandz' rapper Casino.

Charts

Certifications

References

2020 songs
Future (rapper) songs
Lil Uzi Vert songs
Songs written by Future (rapper)
Songs written by Lil Uzi Vert